Delaware wine refers to wine made from grapes grown in the U.S. state of Delaware. Historically, the first Swedish settlers planted grapes and made wine in Delaware as early as 1638.

Delaware has the fewest wineries of any state in the United States.  The largest winery is Nassau Valley Vineyards near Lewes, which makes fruit wines in addition to grape wines. Two others are Pizzadili Winery near Felton, a small, family business which opened in 2007 and Harvest Ridge Winery near Marydel, which opened in 2013.

References

 
Wine regions of the United States by state
Tourism in Delaware
Agriculture in Delaware